While LGBT people are often defined by society for their lack of heterosexual relationships, heterosexual relationships among them are fairly common with 80% of bisexuals are in opposite sex relationships.

With trans people who can be any sexual orientation including heterosexual, this makes a very large portion of LGBT people in heterosexual relationships.

Differences with non-LGBT heterosexual relationships
LGBT people in heteroseual relatonships will often take customs from gay or lesbian relationships they have been in in the past, may use terms like top and bottom for example.

This is not to be confused with queer heterosexuality which is an identity heterosexuals take, which has been accused of cultural appropriation.

Types
The following elements are included in such relationships
 Beards and mixed-orientation marriages
 Lavender marriages
 Male female bisexual couples
 Cis trans heterosexual couples
 Trans "chasers" often identify as heterosexual and thus may fall into the category of queer heterosexuality 51% of men attracted to trans women identify as heterosexual. This is similar for female chasers of FTMs but less prominent because of lower homophobia women face making it so that such relationships fall under less societal scrutiny and stigma.
 A trans man and trans woman together.
 Queer-identifying individuals in heterosexual relationships

See also
 Mixed-orientation marriage
 Bisexuality
 Transgender sexuality

Footnotes

References

Queer theory